Gog is a 1954 independently made American science fiction film produced by Ivan Tors, directed by Herbert L. Strock, and starring Richard Egan, Constance Dowling (in her final big-screen role), and Herbert Marshall. Gog was produced by Ivan Tors Productions and was filmed in Natural Vision 3D. The color process is credited to Color Corporation of America. The film was distributed by United Artists.

Gog is the third and final feature film in Ivan Tors' "Office of Scientific Investigation" (OSI) trilogy, following The Magnetic Monster (1953) and Riders to the Stars (1954).

Plot
Unaccountable, deadly malfunctions begin occurring at a top-secret government facility located under the New Mexico desert, where a space station is being constructed. Dr. David Sheppard, from the Office of Scientific Investigation (OSI) in Washington, D.C., is called in to investigate the mysterious deaths. Working with Joanna Merritt, another OSI agent already at the facility, Sheppard determines that the deaths among the laboratory's 150 top scientists are due to sabotage of the facility's Nuclear Operative Variable Automatic Computer (NOVAC), which controls and co-ordinates all the equipment in the underground facility.

It is far more difficult, however, to determine how the sabotage is being done. The unseen enemy strikes again and again, snuffing out the lives of five scientists and two human test subjects in quick succession, as well as Major Howard, the complex's Chief of Security. In addition, both Madame Elzevir (solar engineering scientist) and Dr. Peter Burden (chief atomic engineer) are attacked, but manage to survive, although both are injured.

Eventually, Sheppard determines that a powerful radio transmitter and receiver were secretly built into NOVAC during its construction in Switzerland, without the knowledge or consent of its designer, Dr. Zeitman. An enemy robot plane, whose fiberglass body does not register on radar, has been flying overhead, beaming precisely focused, ultra-high-frequency radio signals into the complex to control NOVAC's every function. The computer, in turn, controls Gog and Magog, two huge mobile robots with multiple arms, powerful gripping tools, and other implements.

Magog is finally directed to go to the complex's nuclear reactor control room and pull the safety rod out of the atomic pile, starting a chain reaction that will build to a nuclear explosion, which in turn will destroy the entire facility. Sheppard arrives in time to push the safety rod back into the pile, stopping the chain reaction. He then attacks the robot with a flame thrower and disables it, but Gog soon follows its twin to the reactor room to finish the job. Sheppard's flame thrower runs out of fuel as the robot advances on him. Dr. Van Ness arrives with another flame thrower, but the control valve sticks, and Gog now turns on him. Sheppard desperately begins using the nozzle of his flame thrower as a bludgeon, trying to smash the robot's electronic tubes. The now-crippled robot begins spinning back and forth, its arms thrashing about wildly. At that point, Gog suddenly comes to a halt, its metal arms falling limply to its sides. American F-86 and F-94 jet fighters have found and destroyed the enemy plane, ending NOVAC's reign of destruction. Van Ness then realizes that Sheppard and Merritt have been exposed to an overdose of radiation from the reactor.  Sheppard takes Merritt (who has fainted as a result of all the stress she has experienced) into his arms and they head for the complex hospital, where it is determined that their exposure, while causing their film badges to turn red, was not serious, and that they will both soon recover.

A few days later, Dr. Van Ness explains the situation to the Secretary of Defense, informing him that, in spite of all the setbacks, the project is still on schedule, and that a working model of the space station is about to be launched into orbit. The new "baby space station" will be equipped with telescopes and television cameras that will spot any further attempts to sabotage the complex. The Secretary notes with satisfaction: "Nothing will take us by surprise again!" The following morning, the launch goes off without a hitch.

Cast
Richard Egan as David Sheppard
Constance Dowling as Joanna Merritt
Herbert Marshall as Dr. Van Ness
John Wengraf as Dr. Zeitman
Steve Roberts as Maj. Howard
Marian Richman as Technician Helen
Phillip Van Zandt as Dr. Pierre Elzevir
Valerie Vernon as Madame Elzevir
Byron Kane as Dr. Carter
David Alpert as Dr. Peter Burden
Michael Fox as Dr. Hubertus
William Schallert as Dr. Engle
Aline Towne as Dr. Kirby
Jean Dean as Marna Roberts
Al Bayer as Helicopter Pilot
Tom Daly as Secretary 
Andy Andrews as Security Guard Andy
Julian Ludwig as Security Guard Julie

Crew

Joel F. Moss as sound

Production
Gog was filmed on just two sets at Hal Roach Studios, with the exteriors shot at the former military outpost George Air Force Base, near Victorville, California; it was shot in 15 days. Gogs final cost was estimated to be $250,000.

Shortly after the filming of Gog was completed, Constance Dowling married Ivan Tors and retired from acting. Another actor in the film, William Schallert, made his debut in the science fiction genre with this low budget feature; he later appeared in other film genres, ranging from comedies to dramas and back again to science fiction. He also appeared in TV episodes, including the popular Patty Duke series.

Although shot in the 3D process, Gog was released at the tail end of the first 3D fad (1953–1954). As a result, it was often projected "flat" in its aspect ratio of 1.66:1, made standard by Hollywood the year before, despite prints being available in the stereoscopic format.

Reception
The film was previewed in 3D for the press at a United Artists' screening room. Initial critical response to the film ranged from "good" to "very good".

Critical response was generally positive, with many critics noting the story's basis in science fact, rather than science fiction; this was a staple of Tors' science fiction films. His 1955 television series Science Fiction Theatre had the same period verisimilitude, and often lifted props and some situations from Gog and the other two OSI films.

Motion Picture Herald’s William R. Weaver said of Gog, "The production moves steadily forward, keeping interest growing at a steady pace, and exciting the imagination without overstraining credulity".

Home video
Gog was released by Kino International on Region A Blu-ray in 3D and contains audio commentary by Tom Weaver, Bob Furmanek, and David Schecter.

References

Bibliography
 Warren, Bill. Keep Watching the Skies: American Science Fiction Films of the Fifties, 21st Century Edition. Jefferson, North Carolina: McFarland & Company, 2009, (First edition 1982). .

External links

 
 
 
 Gog at the 3-D Film Archive

1954 films
American mystery films
1950s science fiction films
Films directed by Herbert L. Strock
Films scored by Harry Sukman
Films set in New Mexico
1954 3D films
American 3D films
United Artists films
Alien invasions in films
1950s English-language films
American science fiction films
1950s American films